Greco-Roman wrestling competition began in the modern Olympics in 1896. The first Greco-Roman World Wrestling Championships began in 1904. The World Wrestling Championships takes place during non Olympic years. At the World Wrestling Championships team scoring is kept, while no official team standings are kept for the Olympics.

World Level Champions in Greco-Roman Wrestling by Year and Weight

1896

1898

1904

1905

1906–1907

1908–1909

1910

1911

1912

1913

1920

1921–1928

1932–1936

1948–1968

1969–1996

1997–2001

2002–2013

2014–2017

2018–2019

2021

2021–2022

Individual Multiple-Time World Level Champions

12 World Level Championships
     Aleksandr Karelin, 1988–1999

9 World Level Championships
 Mijaín López, 2005–2021

7 World Level Championships
 Valery Rezantsev, 1970–1976

 Hamid Sourian, 2005–2014

6 World Level Championships
 Nikolai Balboshin, 1973–1979

5 World Level Championships
 István Kozma, 1962–1968

 Roman Rurua, 1966–1970

 Viktor Igumenov, 1966–1971

 Petar Kirov, 1968–1974

 Aleksandar Tomov, 1971–1979

 Gogi Koguashvili, 1993–1999

 Hamza Yerlikaya, 1993–2005

  Armen Nazaryan, 1996–2005

  Roman Vlasov, 2011–2021

 Rıza Kayaalp, 2011–2022

 Artur Aleksanyan, 2014–2022

Team Championships

The list below includes unofficial championships won during the Olympic Games, although no official team statistics are kept during Olympic years.

54 World Level Championships
 /  /  /  /  1952–2021

7 World Level Championships
 1908–1950

5 World Level Championships
 /  1904–1920

 /  1911–1924

4 World Level Championships
 /  1896–1928

3 World Level Championships
 2001–2021

 2006–2022

2 World Level Championships
 1984–2007

 2012–2014

1 World Level Championship
 1907

 1971

 1996

 2003

 2005

See also

 List of World and Olympic Champions in men's freestyle wrestling
 List of World and Olympic Champions in women's freestyle wrestling
 United States results in Greco-Roman wrestling

References

Links 
FILA Wrestling Database

Greco-Roman wrestling
Wrestling champions
Wrestling